Ruawai is a small town located 30 km south of Dargaville in Northland, New Zealand.

The name literally translated from Maori means 'two waters' referring to the nearby Northern Wairoa River and Kaipara Harbour. The township primarily serves the outlying farming area which consists mainly of cattle farming and kumara growing and the town declared itself as the Kumara capital of the world.

The local Naumai Marae and Ngā Uri o te Kotahitanga meeting house is a traditional meeting place for Ngāti Whātua and Te Uri o Hau.

History

Ruawai was a location for the late 19th/early 20th century kauri gum digging trade.

Demographics
Ruawai is part of the larger Ruawai-Matakohe statistical area.

Ruawai had a population of 468 at the 2018 New Zealand census, an increase of 36 people (8.3%) since the 2013 census, and an increase of 42 people (9.9%) since the 2006 census. There were 192 households, comprising 240 males and 231 females, giving a sex ratio of 1.04 males per female, with 90 people (19.2%) aged under 15 years, 75 (16.0%) aged 15 to 29, 177 (37.8%) aged 30 to 64, and 129 (27.6%) aged 65 or older.

Ethnicities were 80.1% European/Pākehā, 37.8% Māori, 3.8% Pacific peoples, 1.9% Asian, and 0.6% other ethnicities. People may identify with more than one ethnicity.

Although some people chose not to answer the census's question about religious affiliation, 46.8% had no religion, 33.3% were Christian, 1.9% had Māori religious beliefs, 0.6% were Hindu, 0.6% were Buddhist and 0.6% had other religions.

Of those at least 15 years old, 27 (7.1%) people had a bachelor's or higher degree, and 135 (35.7%) people had no formal qualifications. 21 people (5.6%) earned over $70,000 compared to 17.2% nationally. The employment status of those at least 15 was that 114 (30.2%) people were employed full-time, 51 (13.5%) were part-time, and 24 (6.3%) were unemployed.

Ruawai-Matakohe statistical area

Ruawai-Matakohe had a population of 2,436 at the 2018 New Zealand census, an increase of 147 people (6.4%) since the 2013 census, and an increase of 201 people (9.0%) since the 2006 census. There were 948 households, comprising 1,281 males and 1,152 females, giving a sex ratio of 1.11 males per female. The median age was 47.2 years (compared with 37.4 years nationally), with 447 people (18.3%) aged under 15 years, 345 (14.2%) aged 15 to 29, 1,164 (47.8%) aged 30 to 64, and 480 (19.7%) aged 65 or older.

Ethnicities were 85.8% European/Pākehā, 26.2% Māori, 2.5% Pacific peoples, 1.0% Asian, and 1.7% other ethnicities. People may identify with more than one ethnicity.

The percentage of people born overseas was 9.2, compared with 27.1% nationally.

Although some people chose not to answer the census's question about religious affiliation, 53.9% had no religion, 28.9% were Christian, 3.6% had Māori religious beliefs, 0.1% were Hindu, 0.4% were Buddhist and 1.7% had other religions.

Of those at least 15 years old, 177 (8.9%) people had a bachelor's or higher degree, and 594 (29.9%) people had no formal qualifications. The median income was $23,600, compared with $31,800 nationally. 201 people (10.1%) earned over $70,000 compared to 17.2% nationally. The employment status of those at least 15 was that 852 (42.8%) people were employed full-time, 309 (15.5%) were part-time, and 81 (4.1%) were unemployed.

Education
Ruawai College is a secondary (years 7-13) school with a roll of  students as of  Ruawai District High School was established in 1929. In December 1995, Ruawai College installed a 128kbit/s DDS leased line connection that delivered internet services and offered dialup internet with IGRIN billing the service (IGRIN has since purchased by Orcon). The arrangement delivered internet to the rural community where the nearest dialup internet services were a toll call away, as well as giving the school low cost internet.  At the time, only a handful of schools nationally had a campus-wide, hard wired internet service.

Ruawai School is a contributing primary (years 1-6) school with a roll of  students as of 

Both schools are coeducational.

Notable people
Lockwood Smith, politician.
Roy Billing OAM, noted NZ actor, now domiciled in Australia, was brought up in Ruawai where he attended Ruawai High School

References

External links
 Ruawai College website

Kaipara District
Populated places in the Northland Region
Populated places around the Kaipara Harbour